Harold Albert "Hec" Davidson (29 March 1908 – 24 May 1976) was an Australian rules footballer who played with Melbourne in the Victorian Football League (VFL).

Originally from Sale Football Club, Davidson also played 37 games with Victorian Football Association (VFA) club Camberwell from 1935 to 1937. 

Davidson's brother Arthur played for Hawthorn.

Notes

External links 

1908 births
1976 deaths
Australian rules footballers from Victoria (Australia)
Melbourne Football Club players